Lahu Ke Do Rang may refer to:

Lahu Ke Do Rang (1979 film)
Lahu Ke Do Rang (1997 film)